Doctor Antonio (Italian:Il dottor Antonio) may refer to:

 Doctor Antonio (novel), an 1855 novel by the Italian writer Giovanni Ruffini 
 Doctor Antonio (1914 film), an Italian silent film
 Doctor Antonio (1937 film), an Italian sound film
 Il dottor Antonio (opera), a 1949 work by Franco Alfano
 Doctor Antonio (TV series), an Italian television series broadcast in 1954